Ksenia Mikhailovna Ozerova (born 24 April 1991) is a Russian former pair skater. With Alexander Enbert, she is the 2009 Winter Universiade silver medalist and won two medals on the ISU Junior Grand Prix series.

Career 
Ozerova initially competed with Alexander Enbert, coached by Oksana Kazakova. They won a silver and bronze on the Junior Grand Prix series. This qualified them for the 2008–2009 ISU Junior Grand Prix Final, however they withdrew after the short program.

They made their senior international debut at the 2008 Cup of Russia, where they placed 5th. They were given a berth to the 2009 World Championships after Lubov Iliushechkina and Nodari Maisuradze gave up their spot due to injury. They finished 24th at the event.

The following season, they won silver at Coupe de Nice, finished 8th at Skate Canada International and 6th at Russian senior nationals and split shortly afterward.

Ozerova teamed up with Denis Golubev and finished 11th at 2011 Russian Nationals.

Programs 
(with Enbert)

Competitive highlights

With Golubev

With Enbert

References

External links

 
 Ksenia Ozerova / Alexander Enbert at IceNetwork

Russian female pair skaters
1991 births
Living people
Figure skaters from Saint Petersburg
Universiade medalists in figure skating
Universiade silver medalists for Russia
Competitors at the 2009 Winter Universiade
Competitors at the 2011 Winter Universiade